Infante Alexandre of Portugal (Alexandre Francisco José António Nicolau; , 24 September 1723 - 2 August 1728) was a Portuguese infante, the sixth and last child of King John V of Portugal and his wife Maria Anna of Austria.

Biography
Born on 24 September 1723 in the Ribeira Palace, in Lisbon, the infante was baptized on 6 December as Alexandre Francisco José António Nicolau de Bragança.

In his short life, he revealed an advanced intelligence for his age, through his prompt and ingenious observations, as described by the genealogist António Caetano de Sousa.

He died in the same Palace where he was born on 2 August 1728, at the age of 4, victim of smallpox. He is buried in the Royal Pantheon of the House of Braganza.

Ancestry

References 

1723 births
1728 deaths
People from Lisbon
Portuguese infantes
House of Braganza
18th-century Portuguese people
Burials at the Monastery of São Vicente de Fora
Sons of kings
Royalty who died as children